Christian Augustus (German: Christian August) ( 26 July 1622 – 23 April 1708 ) was the Count Palatine of Sulzbach from 1632 until 1708.

Life
Christian Augustus was born in Sulzbach in 1622 as the eldest son of Augustus, Count Palatine of Sulzbach. He succeeded his father in August 1632, at the age of 10. Christian Augustus was a tolerant ruler. He granted his citizens the right to choose their Christian denomination and introduced the Simultaneum, whereby churches had both Protestant and Catholic services. In 1666 he permitted Jews to settle in the Duchy of Sulzbach. Under his rule, Sulzbach also became an intellectual centre and the site of a regionally significant printing industry.

He had a close relationship with his grand daughter Sibylle of Saxe-Lauenburg, wife of Louis William of Baden-Baden and Regent of her son's dominions. 

Christian Augustus died in Sulzbach in 1708 and was buried in the Church of Sancta Maria in Sulzbach.

Marriage and issue
Christian Augustus married Amalie of Nassau-Siegen (12 September 1615 – 24 August 1669), daughter of Count John VII, on 27 March 1649 and had the following children:
 Hedwig of the Palatinate-Sulzbach (15 April 1650 – 23 November 1681), married on 9 April 1668 Duke Julius Francis of Saxe-Lauenburg 
Amalie (31 May 1651 – 11 December 1721) Nun in Cologne, St. Maria Monastery
John Augustus Hiel (11 December 1654 – 14 April 1658)
Christian (14 August 1656 – 9 November 1657)
Theodore Eustace (14 February 1659 – 11 July 1732) married Landgravine Maria Eleonore of Hesse-Rotenburg and had issue

Ancestors 

1622 births
1708 deaths
House of Wittelsbach
Counts Palatine of Sulzbach

Hereditary Princes of Sulzbach